The Baltimore Bombers were an American indoor lacrosse team based in Baltimore, Maryland. They were a member of the North American Lacrosse League. The Bombers played their home games at Clarence H. "Du" Burns Arena in the Baltimore City neighborhood of Canton.

History
The franchise was announced as an expansion member of the North American Lacrosse League on August 26, 2012. This made the thunder the first professional indoor lacrosse team to call Baltimore home since the Baltimore Thunder left in 1999 to become the Pittsburgh CrosseFire, and the first professional lacrosse team of any kind to call the Baltimore region home since the Baltimore Bayhawks moved to Washington, DC in 2006.

Originally scheduled to start their first season against the expansion Rhode Island Kingfish on January 5, 2013, the first game for the Bombers was January 12, 2013 against the Boston Rockhoppers. The Bombers won this game in 17–16 in overtime.

On March 8, 2013, it was officially reported the Baltimore Bombers had folded. General manager and head coach, Hunter Francis noted that "...the economics didn’t work." This news initially broke on Laxdirt.com and later on their Facebook page. Just two days before, the Bombers posted about a giveaway at the game scheduled for March 10.

Roster

2013 season

Season-by-Season

✝ Folded mid-season

References

External links
Baltimore Bombers official Facebook
Baltimore Bombers official Twitter

North American Lacrosse League teams
Sports teams in Baltimore
Lacrosse clubs established in 2012
2012 establishments in Maryland
Sports clubs disestablished in 2013
2013 disestablishments in Maryland